Sun Anke (born 2 February 1998), also known as Zhang Xiaowei, is a Chinese actress. She is best known for her roles in the dramas Master Devil Do Not Kiss Me (2017), Heavenly Sword and Dragon Slaying Sabre (2019), Arsenal Military Academy (2019), and Dreaming Back to the Qing Dynasty (2019).

Career 
She was born on 2 February 1998 in Tonghua, Jilin, China.

She made her acting debut in 2016 after graduating from Beijing Film Academy.
  
In 2016, Sun made her acting debut in the horror film Failure Ghost Remember. She then starred in the romance comedy drama Master Devil Do Not Kiss Me.

In 2019, Sun gained recognition for starring in wuxia drama  Heavenly Sword and Dragon Slaying Sabre, playing Yang Buhui. The same year, she starred in historical romance drama Dreaming Back to the Qing Dynasty as one of the main leads.

In 2020, Sun was cast in the historical drama Winner Is King, based on the novel Sha Po Lang by Priest.

Filmography

Film

Television series

References 

1998 births
Living people
Chinese television actresses
21st-century Chinese actresses